The 2012 Odlum Brown Vancouver Open was a professional tennis tournament played on outdoor hard courts. It was the 8th edition, for men, and 11th edition, for women, of the tournament and part of the 2012 ATP Challenger Tour and the 2012 ITF Women's Circuit, offering totals of $100,000, for men, and $100,000, for women, in prize money. It took place in West Vancouver, British Columbia, Canada between July 30 and August 5, 2012.

Men's singles main-draw entrants

Seeds

1 Rankings are as of July 23, 2012

Other entrants
The following players received wildcards into the singles main draw:
 Philip Bester
 Bradley Klahn
 Filip Peliwo
 Jack Sock

The following players received entry from the qualifying draw:
 Chase Buchanan
 Pierre-Ludovic Duclos
 Gleb Sakharov
 Fritz Wolmarans

Women's singles main-draw entrants

Seeds

1 Rankings are as of July 23, 2012

Other entrants
The following players received wildcards into the singles main draw:
 Mallory Burdette
 Gabriela Dabrowski
 Bethanie Mattek-Sands
 Carol Zhao

The following players received entry from the qualifying draw:
 Lauren Embree
 Nicole Gibbs
 Krista Hardebeck
 Ashley Weinhold

The following player received entry as a lucky loser:
 Sherazad Benamar

Champions

Men's singles

 Igor Sijsling def.  Sergei Bubka, 6–1, 7–5

Men's doubles

 Maxime Authom /  Ruben Bemelmans def.  John Peers /  John-Patrick Smith, 6–4, 6–2

Women's singles

 Mallory Burdette def.  Jessica Pegula, 6–3, 6–0

Women's doubles

 Julia Glushko /  Olivia Rogowska def.  Jacqueline Cako /  Natalie Pluskota, 6–4, 5–7, [10–7]

External links
Official website

Odlum Brown Vancouver Open
Odlum Brown Vancouver Open
Vancouver Open
Odlum Brown Vancouver Open